Otor (also Eto, Oto or Otoor) is a sacred food formulated by the GaDangme (or Ga) tribe of Ghana for special occasions such as: the 'Twins-Festival (Akweley Suma), Outdooring Naming Ceremony and '8th Day Abrahamic' circumcision, which is now widely observed by other tribes including the Akans, birthday celebration of which predominantly the mashed-yam version of the food is used, with seldom use of the mashed-plantain version, weddings and Dipo/Atofo(or Otofo)/Ashimi puberty rites.

The food comes in various forms; including the 'Mashed-Yam' form and the 'Mashed-Plantain' form and has been widely adopted by some of the neighbouring Akan-Tribes. The GaDangme Etor is the most popular of the sacred foods prepared for the twins during the 'Twins-Festival'. Others such as 'Naji Enyo' or 'Naji Ejwe' (which is traditionally rice or yam with tomatoes-based-stew, garnished with boiled-eggs and 'Kelewele') is not as popular.

Etymology
'Eto(or Etor)' is an 'Akan' corruption of the actual name 'Oto (or Otoor)', a Ga-language word dating as far back as in the 1800s.

Ingredients 

 Ripped plantain
 Pepper
Palm oil
Salt
Salted Fish

 Roasted peanuts

Method of preparation 

 Peel of the plantain, cut into pieces and boil
 Add salt to taste
 Boil the pepper and grind together with onions
Grind the roasted peanut or peanut butter
Grind salted fish to smoky flavor
 Add the sliced boiled plantain and mash together
Add teaspoons full of palm oil with fried onions and mix with the mashed plantain evenly.
Garnish with boiled egg, sliced avocado and roasted peanut

See also 

 Ghanaian cuisine

External link 
 Video:How to prepare Etor the Ashanti way

References 

Ghanaian cuisine